Jabbar is an Arabic word meaning "giant" or "almighty". With the definite article as al-Jabbar it is one of the names of God in Islam, and is so used in the given name Abd al-Jabbar.

Al-Jabbar as surname
Abdul Jalilul Jabbar (ruled 1649–1652), 12th Sultan of Brunei
Abdul-Karim al-Jabbar (born 1974), American football player

Jabbar as given name
Jabbar Garyagdioglu (1861–1944), Azerbaijani folk singer
Jabbar Baghtcheban (1884-1966), Iranian worker with the deaf
Jabbar Patel (born 1942), Indian theatre and film director
Jabbar Savalan (born ca. 1991), Azerbaijani blogger
Jawad Jabbar Sadkhan Al-Sahlani, Iraqi held in Guantanamo

Jabbar as surname
Javed Jabbar, Pakistani politician
Mehreen Jabbar (born 1971), Pakistani filmmaker and daughter of Javed Jabbar
Pat Jabbar, music producer
Kareem Abdul-Jabbar (born 1947), American basketball player (occasionally appears as "Jabbar" in box scores)

Other uses
Al-Jabbar, the Arabic name of the constellation Orion
Jabbar Khel, Afghan clan
Khak-i Jabbar, village in Afghanistan
Khaki Jabbar District, Afghanistan
Jabbar, Khuzestan, a village in Khuzestan Province, Iran
Jabbar, Razavi Khorasan, a village in Razavi Khorasan Province, Iran
Jabbar, alternate name of Kalateh-ye Jabbar, a village in Razavi Khorasan Province, Iran
Jabbar, South Khorasan, a village in South Khorasan Province, Iran

Fictional uses
Jabbar (The 99), a character in The 99 comics
Gom jabbar, a weapon from the Dune universe

See also
 Abdul Jabbar
 Jabari

Names of God in Islam